Kalloorani is a village Panchayat in Virudhunagar district, 10 km south-east of Aruppukkottai, Tamil Nadu.

Name 
Kalloorani was earlier named as Thennagaiyur (தென்னாகையூர்) by the Pandyas. Later renamed as Kalloorani(கல்லூரணி) due to the water resources like ponds and wells.

Facilities 
Important buildings are the Kalloorani Sub Post Office, a branch of the Tamilnad Mercantile Bank, a Government Library and also the government hospital.

Education 
SBK Higher Secondary School is located here.

Adjacent communities

Reference 

Villages in Virudhunagar district